Dionne Marie "Dee" Collins  (born 1965) is a British retired police officer, who served as Chief Constable of West Yorkshire Police from 2016 to 2019. She served a secondment from West Yorkshire Police to the College of Policing where she was Director for the 2019 Strategic Command Course. Due to ill health, having been previously treated for breast cancer, she stepped down as Chief Constable and retired from the police in April 2019.

Honours

References

1965 births
Living people
Chief Constables of West Yorkshire Police
English recipients of the Queen's Police Medal
People educated at Manchester High School for Girls
Commanders of the Order of the British Empire